Zev Golan is an Israeli historian, author, and Senior Research Fellow at the Jerusalem Institute for Market Studies, where he was previously Director of the Public Policy Center. In the 1970s he was one of the world's foremost Nazi hunters. Coordinating with Simon Wiesenthal and Israeli Police he helped bring justice to Archbishop Valerian Trifa and  Boleslavs Maikovskis. He moved to Israel in 1979.

Books
Golan is the author of many books, among them:
 God, Man and Nietzsche: A Startling Dialogue Between Judaism and Modern Philosophers
 Free Jerusalem: Heroes, Heroines And Rogues Who Created The State Of Israel
 Stern: The Man and His Gang
 Golan also translated the memoirs of Stern Group commander Israel Eldad into English.
 Golan is the English translator of Hanna Armoni's Hebrew memoirs of her teenage years in the Stern Group, Are You Waiting for Eliahu?
 Machtarot Be'Maasar (The History of the Jerusalem Central Prison During the British Mandate, in Hebrew)
 Michtavim Nivcharim (editor of Israel Eldad: Selected Letters 1944-1995, in Hebrew)
 Shofarot Shel Mered (The Shofars of the Revolt, in Hebrew)
 Zion's Captive Heroes
 The Western Wall Wars
 Lechu Neranena Le'et Hageula (editor of a selection of commentaries by Shlomo Molcho, in Hebrew) 
 Kitvei Shlomo Molcho (editor, The Collected Writings of Shlomo Molcho, in Hebrew)

References

Year of birth missing (living people)
Living people
Israeli historians
Israeli Jews
Israeli male writers
People from Jerusalem
Nazi hunters